Václav Marhoul (born 30 January 1960 in Prague) is a Czech film director, screenwriter and actor. He studied at Prague's FAMU, graduating in 1984. He directed his first film Mazaný Filip, based on Raymond Chandler's books, in 2003. In 2008, his second film Tobruk was premiered. His next film The Painted Bird, based on Jerzy Kosiński's novel of the same title, premiered at the 76th Venice International Film Festival. He also starred in several films such as Gympl (2007), Ulovit miliardáře (2009) and Cesta do lesa (2012).

He is set to make his English-language debut with a biographical film about Joseph McCarthy, with Michael Shannon in the lead role, and co-starring Emilia Clarke, Dane DeHaan and Scoot McNairy.

References

External links
 

1960 births
20th-century Czech male actors
21st-century Czech male actors
Living people
Film directors from Prague
Male actors from Prague
Academy of Performing Arts in Prague alumni
Czech film directors
Czech male film actors
Czech screenwriters
Male screenwriters